The 2013 Savannah State Tigers football team represented Savannah State University in the 2013 NCAA Division I FCS football season. The Tigers are members of the Mid-Eastern Athletic Conference (MEAC).  This was their first season under the guidance of head coach Earnest Wilson, and the Tigers played their home games at Ted Wright Stadium. They finished the season 1–11, 0–8 in MEAC play to finish in last place.

Coaches and support staff
Savannah State will go into the 2013 season with a completely new staff. On April 17, athletic director Sterling Steward Jr. announced that only cornerbacks coach Corey Barlow would return for the 2013 season. Barlow became the interim head coach until Savannah State announced the hiring of Coach Wilson on June 7, 2013.

Media
Radio flagship: WHCJBroadcasters: Toby Hyde (play-by-play), Curtis Foster (analyst)

Schedule

Game summaries

Georgia Southern

Troy

Fort Valley State

Miami

Delaware State

Norfolk State

Florida A&M

Bethune-Cookman

North Carolina Central

South Carolina State

Howard

North Carolina A&T

References

Savannah State
Savannah State Tigers football seasons
Savannah State Tigers football